In enzymology, a formamidase is an enzyme that catalyzes the chemical reaction

formamide + H2O  formate + NH3

Thus, the two substrates of this enzyme are formamide and H2O, whereas its two products are formate and NH3.

This enzyme belongs to the family of hydrolases, those acting on carbon-nitrogen bonds other than peptide bonds, specifically in linear amides.  The systematic name of this enzyme class is formamide amidohydrolase. This enzyme participates in glyoxylate and dicarboxylate metabolism and nitrogen metabolism.

Structural studies

References

 
 

EC 3.5.1
Enzymes of known structure